The 2023 Conference USA women's basketball tournament will be held March 8-11 2023, at Ford Center at The Star in Frisco, Texas. All  games of the tournament will be televised on ESPN+ except the  championship game which will air on CBS Sports Network. The winner of the tournament will receive the conference's automatic bid to the 2023 NCAA tournament.

Seeds
Teams were seeded by conference record. The top five teams received byes to the quarterfinals.

Schedule

Bracket 

* – Denotes overtime period

See also 
2023 Conference USA men's basketball tournament
 Conference USA women's basketball tournament
 Conference USA

References

External links 
 Conference USA tournament Central

Tournament
Conference USA women's basketball tournament
Basketball competitions in Texas
College basketball tournaments in Texas
Sports in Frisco, Texas
Conference USA women's basketball tournament
Conference USA women's basketball tournament
Women's sports in Texas